"Put 'Em Up" is Namie Amuro's 23rd solo single under the Avex Trax label. Produced by Dallas Austin, "Put 'Em Up" was meant for release in 2000 but was shelved until 2003. Commercially, the song was Amuro's lowest selling solo single until the release of Big Boys Cry/Beautiful in 2013, the second single including her sixth studio album Style (2003).

Overview
In early 2002, Amuro announced the release of her second greatest hits compilation, Love Enhanced Single Collection. It was to include a previously unreleased track, "Put 'Em Up," but upon release was left off the album. It was not the first time, however, that the song would be shelved. Penned by Dallas Austin, the song was first announced for release in 2000. It was also first recorded as a duet between her and Chilli of the R&B girl group, TLC. When it was first cancelled no explanation was given.

The song was finally released on July 16, 2003. Amuro explained in an interview with Viewsic (now M-ON) that she didn't release the song at first because the lyrics were harsh and may have clashed with the image her fans had of her. Her decision to release the song in 2003 was due to her experiences with the R&B project, Suite Chic. The song was also held back because she was not completely satisfied with the lyrics. Before releasing it, she had songwriter Michico rewrite Japanese lyrics for the song. She felt that the way Michico wrote the Japanese lyrics allowed her to express a side of herself that her old image prevented. She noted in the interview that had Michico not worked on the song with her that it probably would have been delayed indefinitely.

Accolades
On February 5, 2004, "Put 'Em Up" was nominated for the "Best Your Choice" and "Best R&B Video" award at the Space Shower Music Video Awards. On March 16, 2004, she was also nominated for "Best R&B Video" and "Best buzzASIA from Japan" award at the MTV Japan Video Music Awards. Although she lost both Space Shower awards, she took home both awards for her nominations at the MTV awards.

Music video
The promotional video for "Put 'Em Up" premiered as an MTV Japan Exclusive on June 25, 2003. It was filmed in Kanagawa, Japan and directed by UGICHIN. The video takes place in an automechanic garage. Unlike many of Amuro's videos, it played up the theme of the song including using parts of the lyrics within it. The routine Amuro and her dancers performed in the video also featured choreographed fighting.

Track listing
 "Put 'Em Up" (Dallas Austin, Jasper Cameron, michico) – 4:03
 "Exist for You" (Debra Killings, Michiko Ai) – 4:19
 "Put 'Em Up (Instrumental)" (Dallas Austin) – 4:03
 "Exist for You (Instrumental)" (Debra Killings) – 4:17

Personnel
 Namie Amuro – vocals
 Michico – background vocals
 Moca – Dancer
 Rika – Dancer
 Ryo – Dancer
 Shige – Dancer
 Subaru – Dancer

Production
 Producers – Dallas Austin, Debra Killings
 Mixing – Keven "KD" Davis, Alvin Speights
 Vocal Direction – Daisuke Imai
 Music Video Director – Ugichin
 Choreographer – Warner

TV Performances
 July 4, 2003 – CDTV
 July 14, 2003 – Hey! Hey! Hey! Music Champ
 July 25, 2003 – Music Station
 July 2003 – AX Music Factory
 September 22, 2003 – Hey! Hey! Hey! Music Champ Awards

Charts
Oricon Sales Chart (Japan)

2003 singles
2003 songs
Namie Amuro songs
Songs written by Dallas Austin
Songs written by Jasper Cameron
Avex Trax singles